WIFA may refer to:

Weather Info for All Initiative, a meteorological organization.
West Indies Federal Archives Centre, the official depository of records from the defunct West Indies Federation.
Western India Football Association, the state governing body for football in Maharashtra, India.
WIFA (AM), a radio station in Knoxville, Tennessee.
Windward Islands Football Association, organizers of the Windward Islands Tournament.
WIFA, online football manager, since November 15, 1998.